Transavia Airlines C.V., trading as Transavia and formerly branded as transavia.com, is a Dutch low-cost airline and a wholly owned subsidiary of KLM and therefore part of the Air France–KLM group. Its main base is Amsterdam Airport Schiphol and it has other bases at Rotterdam The Hague Airport and Eindhoven Airport. Transavia maintains Transavia France as its French subsidiary.

History

Early years
The first brainstorming sessions about starting a second charter company in the Netherlands, after Martinair, started in spring 1966, when the American Chalmers Goodlin met with captain Pete Holmes. "Slick" Goodlin had recently bought the dormant small company Transavia Limburg, based in Maastricht, which had three DC-6's available. The Dutch government needed to be approached in order to obtain an operating license for the airline, both in order to be allowed to operate out of Amsterdam Airport, and for these DC-6s.

At that stage John Block, a former member of the Martinair Holland management, was willing to take that on. He succeeded, the license was issued on 14 November 1966 and two days later on 16 November 1966 the airline's first commercial flight – Amsterdam/Naples/Amsterdam – was completed; flown by Captain Pete Holmes, on board were the Dutch Ballet Orchestra and the Dutch Dance Theatre. This was the first flight with the new name of Transavia Holland.

The company found offices at the old Schiphol Airport, Hangar 7 and the fledgling's financier Slick Goodlin appointed the three-pronged management: Commercial Director J.N. Block, Director Operations H.G. Holmes, and Technical Director Kees de Blok. Some of the first employees were pilots John Schurman (Canadian), Hans Steinbacher & Pim Sierks (Dutch), Chief Stewardess Willy Holmes-Spoelder and her stewardesses: Senior Stewardess Wil Dammers and six carefully selected and trained young women.

The first of fourteen secondhand Sud Caravelle twin-jet airliners to be operated by Transavia was delivered in summer 1969 and the type remained in service with the airline until being replaced by further deliveries of Boeing 737s in 1976.

Development since the 1980s
Building up the airline from scratch, ten years later Transavia had a marketshare of 45% of the Dutch holiday market and became the main competitor of Martinair. In 1986, the Transavia Holland brand was changed into Transavia Airlines. It was the first airline to take advantage of the first open skies agreement signed between the UK and Dutch governments. Transavia started operating its first scheduled service on the Amsterdam to London Gatwick route on 26 October 1986.

During 1991, the airline's major shareholder, Nedlloyd, sold its 80% holding to KLM. In 1998, Transavia was the first foreign airline to operate domestic services in Greece following a change in Greek aviation law. In June 2003, KLM acquired the remaining 20% of Transavia, making it 100% KLM owned. The subsequent merger of Air France and KLM made Transavia a wholly owned subsidiary of Air France-KLM.

In the early 2000s, Transavia was primarily a charter airline with a low-cost airline subsidiary called Basiq Air. To strengthen its brand image, the two were combined under the transavia.com domain name on 1 January 2005.

Transavia has a French unit, Transavia France, based at Paris-Orly, which also operates 737-800s. A Danish unit, Transavia Denmark, based at Copenhagen, operated from 2008 until April 2011 when it was shut down after failing to meet expectations.

A strike was organised by Air France pilots in September 2014, in protest against the Air France-KLM group's increased focus on the development of Transavia, whose pilots were being paid less than those of Air France.

By early 2015, Transavia received a new corporate design dropping the ".com" from its public appearance and changed its primary colors from white/green/blue to white/green. The airline is now to be positioned as Air France-KLM's low-cost brand for the Netherlands and France.

In February 2017, Transavia announced that it would shut down its base at Munich Airport by late October 2017 after only a year of service due to a change in their business strategy and negative economic outlook.

In December 2019, Transavia announced the launch of its base at Brussels Airport, initially operating nine routes from the airport.

In December 2021, after a delay due to the coronavirus, the base at Brussels Airport was opened. Transavia will station one aircraft at the Belgian airport.

Corporate affairs

Head office

Transavia has its head office in the TransPort Building, Schiphol East, on the grounds of Amsterdam Airport Schiphol, Haarlemmermeer, Netherlands. Transavia moved into the new building on 3 May 2010 with about 400 employees. Previously the head office was in the Building Triport III at Schiphol Airport.

Ownership and structure
Transavia Airlines C.V. is 100% owned by KLM, which in turn is owned by Air France–KLM; however Transavia is run as an independent operation. It holds a 4,49% interest in the French airline Transavia France S.A.S (the remaining 95,51% is owned by Air France S.A.), which operates in the French market. Transavia France also operates under the brand name of transavia, with an identical business model, website, and image.

Business trends

The financials for both parts of the Transavia brand (Transavia Netherlands and Transavia France) are fully incorporated in the published annual accounts of their ultimate parent, Air France-KLM. Results reported for the Transavia brand are (figures for years ending 31 December):

Business model
Transavia operates as a low-cost carrier, and as such uses a single aircraft type (Boeing 737 in their case) with a single class of cabin. The airline offers the "Selection on Board" buy on board service offering food and drinks for purchase. Commencing 5 April 2011, Transavia introduced fees for hold luggage and changed the rules for hand luggage, with the maximum allowable weight for hand luggage increased from 5 kg to 10 kg.

Destinations

Fleet

Current fleet
, Transavia (excluding Transavia France) operates the following registered aircraft:

During the busy summer season, Transavia regularly leases additional 737 aircraft from Sun Country Airlines, a US airline based in Eagan, Minnesota. During the slower winter season, which corresponds to Sun Country's busy season, Sun Country leases several planes from Transavia. This reciprocal arrangement allows both airlines to balance their fleets to reflect seasonal demand. Transavia also leases services from different charter airlines during the peak summer season to operate flights on their behalf.

Historical fleet

Over the years, Transavia has operated the following aircraft types in its mainline fleet:

Additional aircraft types were part of the fleet in small numbers and only for short-term periods.

Accidents and incidents
No fatalities or complete loss of aircraft have occurred on Transavia flights. In 1997 two incidents occurred with substantial damage to the aircraft:

On 8 February 1997, Transavia Airlines Flight 484, a Boeing 737-300 flying from Salzburg to Amsterdam, was damaged en route. The push/pull rod of the elevator broke off, damaging the Boeing 737's rudder, and an emergency landing was made at Nuremberg Airport. There were no fatalities, but the FAA issued an Airworthiness Directive after this and a similar incident.

On 24 December 1997, Transavia Airlines Flight 462, a Boeing 757-200 flying from Gran Canaria to Amsterdam, was seriously damaged during landing. The aircraft landed in strong, gusty winds and touched down hard with its right main gear first. On touchdown the nose gear doghouse collapsed, inflicting serious damage on some electrical and electronic systems and control cables. After sliding over the runway for approximately 3 km, the aircraft came to rest in the grass beside the runway. The plane was evacuated successfully, and no fatalities or serious injuries occurred. The aircraft returned to service after repairs.

On 6 September 2019, Transavia Airlines Flight 1041 attempted to take off from Taxiway D instead of Runway 18C at Amsterdam Airport Schiphol. Airtraffic controllers ordered the aircraft to stop immediately. No injuries were reported.

See also
 Transavia Denmark
 Transavia France

References

External links

 

Airlines of the Netherlands
Airlines established in 1965
Low-cost carriers
Air France–KLM
European Low Fares Airline Association
Dutch brands
Dutch companies established in 1965
Companies based in North Holland
Haarlemmermeer